Hovin Station is a railway station in the village of Hovin in the municipality of Melhus in Trøndelag county, Norway. Hovin Station is served by local trains to Røros. The station was opened 1864 as part of the Trondhjem–Støren Line. The Gulfoss Tunnel lies just north of this station.

References

Railway stations in Melhus
Railway stations on the Dovre Line
Railway stations opened in 1864
1864 establishments in Norway